The Truth in Lending Act (TILA) of 1968 is a United States federal law designed to promote the informed use of consumer credit, by requiring disclosures about its terms and cost to standardize the manner in which costs associated with borrowing are calculated and disclosed.

TILA also gives consumers the right to cancel certain credit transactions that involve a lien on a consumer's principal dwelling, regulates certain credit card practices, and provides a means for fair and timely resolution of credit billing disputes. With the exception of certain high-cost mortgage loans, TILA does not regulate the charges that may be imposed for consumer credit. Rather, it requires uniform or standardized disclosure of costs and charges so that consumers can shop. The regulation prohibits certain acts or practices in connection with credit secured by a consumer's principal dwelling.

History
The Truth in Lending Act was originally Title I of the Consumer Credit Protection Act, . Most of the specific requirements imposed by TILA are found in Regulation Z, so a reference to the requirements of TILA usually refers to the requirements contained in Regulation Z, as well as the statute itself.

From TILA's inception, the authority to implement the statute by issuing regulations was given to the Federal Reserve Board (FRB). However, effective July 21, 2011, TILA's general rule making authority was transferred to the Consumer Financial Protection Bureau (CFPB), whose authority was established pursuant to provisions enacted by the passage of the Dodd–Frank Wall Street Reform and Consumer Protection Act in July 2010. The Federal Reserve will retain some limited rule making authority under TILA for loans made by certain motor vehicle dealers, and for certain other provisions.

The TILA introduced the Annual Percentage Rate (APR) calculation mandated for all consumer lenders.  Certain misleading interest rate calculations used previously, mainly on auto loans, were barred.  For more than a decade, consumer loans were reported by APR in an economically meaningful way.  Then in the 1980s the auto manufacturers began to exploit a loophole in TILA and its administration. Neither the Act nor its administrators adequately differentiated between "amount financed" and "finance charges", two terms that appear on the TILA required disclosure statements.  By "bundling" the price of the car and its financing charges (which come from the auto maker's captive finance company), auto makers were able to shift money between the two categories, even to eliminating the financing charge entirely.  Thus "zero percent APR" financing was born.

Typical offers from auto companies are "Zero Percent APR financing available or $1,000 rebate".  The consumer who elects "zero percent" financing gives up a $1,000 rebate (reduction in car price).  Effectively, he or she pays $1,000 to get the "interest free" loan.  Since only auto makers can do this type of bundling, banks, credit unions and other competitors are left at a disadvantage.  They must disclose true APR rates while the auto makers can claim no interest costs.  In the process, the typical consumer is left with a complex finance problem.  "Zero percent" financing can cost a lot less, or a lot more, than conventional financing with a non-auto maker institution.

Organization
The regulation is divided into subparts.

Subpart B relates to open-end credit lines (revolving credit accounts), which includes credit card accounts and home-equity lines of credit (HELOCs).

Subpart C relates to closed-end credit, such as home-purchase loans and motor vehicle loans with a fixed loan term. It contains rules on disclosures, treatment of credit balances, annual percentage rate calculations, right of rescission, non requirements, and advertising.

Subpart D contains rules on oral disclosures, Spanish language disclosure in Puerto Rico, record retention, effect on state laws, state exemptions (which only apply to states that had Truth in Lending-type laws prior to the Federal Act), and rate limitations.

Subpart E contains special rules for mortgage transactions.
 § 1026.32 frames the requirements for certain closed-end home mortgages.
 § 1026.33 are requirements for reverse mortgage mortgages, including the total annual loan cost rate and transaction disclosures.
 § 1026.34 prohibits acts or practices in connection with "high-cost" mortgages.
 § 1026.35 prohibits acts or practices in connection with "higher-priced" mortgage loans (HPMLs).
 § 1026.36 prohibits acts or practices in connection with credit secured by a dwelling.
 § 1026.39 deals with mortgage transfer disclosure guidelines.
 § 1026.40 sets the requirements for home equity plans.
 § 1026.42 aims to promote valuation independence.

Several appendices contain information such as the procedures for determinations about state laws, state exemptions and issuance of staff interpretations, special rules for certain kinds of credit plans, a list of enforcement agencies, model disclosures that, if used properly, will ensure compliance with the Act, and the rules for computing annual percentage rates in closed-end credit transactions and total annual loan cost rates for reverse mortgage transactions.

Right of rescission

For certain transactions secured by a borrower's principle dwelling, TILA requires that the borrower be granted three business days following loan consummation to rescind the transaction. The right of rescission allows borrowers time to reexamine the credit agreement and cost disclosures, as well as to reconsider whether they want to place their homes at risk by offering it as security for the credit.  Each borrower and any person who has a vested interest in the property may exercise the right to rescind until midnight of the third business day following consummation, or delivery of all material disclosures, whichever occurs last.  If the required rescission notice or material TILA disclosures are inaccurate or not delivered, the borrowers right to rescind may be extended from three days after consummation to up to three years.

When a borrower rescinds, the security interest becomes void and the borrower is not liable for any amount, including finance charges.  The bank must return any money or property given to anyone in connection with the transaction within 20 calendar days and remove any record of security interest that the bank may have taken for the new loan.  Until the rescission period has ended, the bank may not 1) disperse funds other than to a valid escrow account, 2) perform any services, or 3) deliver any materials.

The right of rescission does not apply to loans that are obtained for the purpose of purchasing a home, nor does it apply to a refinance or consolidation of a home loan with the same creditor unless the amount refinanced or consolidated exceeds the unpaid balance on the existing debt.

Exemptions
TILA requirements do not apply to the following types of loans or credit:

 Credit extended primarily for business, agricultural or commercial purposes.
 Credit extended to an entity (not a person, with an exception for certain trusts for tax or estate planning), including government agencies or instrumentalities.
 Credit in excess of an annually adjusted threshold, not secured by real estate or personal property, used or expected to be used as a principal dwelling.

See also
 Truth in Savings Act

References

Further reading
 Truth in Lending Act (PDF/details) as amended in the GPO Statute Compilations collection
 United States Code (2004). 15 USC 1601 et seq..
 Regulation text
 Truth in Lending Handbook, Office of Comptroller of the Currency, Administrator of National Banks, December 2006.
 Truth in Lending Act Legislative History Law Librarian's Society of D.C.

1968 in law
1968 in the United States
Consumer protection in the United States
Consumer protection law
Consumer protection legislation
United States federal banking legislation